Monte Maggiorasca is a mountain on the border between Liguria and Emilia-Romagna, northern Italy.

Geography 

The mountain is the  highest peak (1,799 m) of the Ligurian Apennines.

It overlooks Val d'Aveto  and Val Nure, and the comuni of Santo Stefano d'Aveto (province of Genoa) and Ferriere (province of Piacenza). On the summit is the statue of Our Lady of Guadalupe, erected in 1947 and a TV communication system.

References

External links
 Val d'Aveto

Mountains of Emilia-Romagna
Mountains of Liguria
One-thousanders of Italy
Mountains of the Apennines